Cassa di Risparmio di Fossano is an Italian saving bank based in Fossano, in the Province of Cuneo, Piedmont.

Monte di Pietà di Fossano was found in 1591. In 1905 the bank was formed by the mount of piety. Since the bank reforms in 1991, the bank was split into a società per azioni and a non-profit banking foundation. Cassa di Risparmio di Torino (Banca CRT) once became a minority shareholders of the bank. However its successor, UniCredit, sold their possession on Fossano (23.077%), Bra (31.021%), Saluzzo (31.019%) and Savigliano (31.006%) to Banca Popolare dell'Emilia Romagna for about €149 million in 2006. (which BPER paid €36.898 million for CR Fossano's shares)

See also
 Cassa di Risparmio di Cuneo

References

Banks established in 1905
Italian companies established in 1905
Banks of Italy
Companies based in Piedmont
Fossano